226 (two hundred [and] twenty-six) is the natural number following 225 and preceding 227.

In mathematics 

226 is a happy number, and a semiprime (2×113),
and a member of Aronson's sequence.
At most 226 different permutation patterns can occur within a single 9-element permutation.

References

Integers